The name Elida has been used for several tropical cyclones in the Eastern Pacific Ocean.
 Hurricane Elida (1984) – a Category 4 hurricane with no impacts on land
 Hurricane Elida (1990) – a Category 1 hurricane with no impacts on land
 Tropical Storm Elida (1996) – a moderate tropical storm with limited impacts, mainly rainfall, on the Baja California peninsula
 Hurricane Elida (2002) – a rare Category 5 hurricane that strengthened in record time for a Pacific hurricane; impacts on land were limited to large swells
 Hurricane Elida (2008) – a Category 2 hurricane with no impacts on land
 Tropical Storm Elida (2014) – a weak tropical storm with no impacts on land
 Hurricane Elida (2020) – a Category 2 hurricane with no impacts on land

Pacific hurricane set index articles